Petersburg is a village in Boone County, Nebraska, United States. The population was 333 at the 2010 census. Petersburg is the site of a memorial to Logan Fontenelle, an Omaha chief who was killed nearby, in a skirmish with Brulé and Arapaho in 1855, at the site of the present-day Olson Nature Preserve.

History
Petersburg was platted in 1887 when the railroad was extended to that point. The community was named for John Peters, the original owner of the town site.

Geography
Petersburg is located at  (41.852867, -98.080131).

Demographics

2010 census
As of the census of 2010, there were 333 people, 145 households, and 94 families residing in the village. The racial makeup of the village was 98.8% White and 1.2% from two or more races. Hispanic or Latino of any race were 1.8% of the population.

There were 145 households, of which 24.1% had children under the age of 18 living with them, 58.6% were married couples living together, 3.4% had a female householder with no husband present, 2.8% had a male householder with no wife present, and 35.2% were non-families. 33.1% of all households were made up of individuals, and 20% had someone living alone who was 65 years of age or older. The average household size was 2.30 and the average family size was 2.94.

The median age in the village was 46.2 years. 22.2% of residents were under the age of 18; 7.8% were between the ages of 18 and 24; 18.9% were from 25 to 44; 27.6% were from 45 to 64; and 23.4% were 65 years of age or older. The gender makeup of the village was 49.2% male and 50.8% female.

2000 census
As of the census of 2000, there were 374 people, 165 households, and 102 families residing in the village. The population density was 1,013.5 people per square mile (390.3/km). There were 183 housing units at an average density of 495.9 per square mile (191.0/km). The racial makeup of the village was 97.59% White, 1.87% from other races, and 0.53% from two or more races. Hispanic or Latino of any race were 1.87% of the population.

There were 165 households, out of which 28.5% had children under the age of 18 living with them, 51.5% were married couples living together, 6.1% had a female householder with no husband present, and 37.6% were non-families. 37.6% of all households were made up of individuals, and 26.1% had someone living alone who was 65 years of age or older. The average household size was 2.25 and the average family size was 2.97.

In the village, the population was spread out, with 27.3% under the age of 18, 5.1% from 18 to 24, 19.3% from 25 to 44, 20.3% from 45 to 64, and 28.1% who were 65 years of age or older. The median age was 44 years. For every 100 females, there were 86.1 males. For every 100 females age 18 and over, there were 92.9 males.

As of 2000 the median income for a household in the village was $29,688, and the median income for a family was $39,792. Males had a median income of $29,375 versus $21,964 for females. The per capita income for the village was $17,312. About 3.8% of families and 8.8% of the population were below the poverty line, including 3.8% of those under age 18 and 17.1% of those age 65 or over.

Notable person

Clarence "C.L." Werner, founder of Werner Enterprises, lived in Petersburg until the age of 19.

References

Villages in Boone County, Nebraska
Villages in Nebraska